"Little Woman Love" is a Wings song released as the B-side of the non album single "Mary Had a Little Lamb" on 12 May 1972 by Apple Reords.

History
It was composed by Paul McCartney in 1970 and recorded during the Ram sessions but left off the album. In keeping with McCartney's practice at the time, the composition was credited to Paul and Linda McCartney. 

Beatle biographer John Blaney describes "Little Woman Love" as a "breezy rocker" with a rockabilly feel.  The song is unusual for Wings in that instead of Paul McCartney playing electric bass guitar, jazz musician Milt Hinton plays slap bass.

Cash Box described it as a "Lady Madonna-ish rocker."

Reception and charts
While "Mary Had a Little Lamb" was dismissed by the critics, it climbed to the top 10 in the United Kingdom. In the United States, however, radio stations also played "Little Woman Love." As a result, the picture sleeve for "Mary Had a Little Lamb" was revised by Apple Records to have a separate listing for the flip side. The single reached number 28 on the Billboard Hot 100 in the US. On the Cash Box chart, which listed single sides separately, "Little Woman Love" only appeared for one week at number 95.

Release
"Little Woman Love" was never released on an album until 1993, when it was included as a bonus track to Wild Life in The Paul McCartney Collection. It was included on the Special and Deluxe editions of Ram and Red Rose Speedway.  It was later included on The 7" Singles Box in 2022.

Personnel 
Paul McCartney – piano, lead vocal
Linda McCartney – backing vocal
David Spinozza – guitar
Hugh McCracken – guitar
Denny Seiwell – drums, percussion
Milt Hinton – double bass

Notes

References

1972 singles
Apple Records singles
Music published by MPL Music Publishing
Paul McCartney songs
Song recordings produced by Paul McCartney
Songs written by Linda McCartney
Songs written by Paul McCartney
Paul McCartney and Wings songs